The  Arshakid Kings Mausoleum and Basilica (also Tomb of the Arshakid Kings or Arshakuni Tomb) is a grave monument complex that sits along a gorge overlooking the Amberd River, and is located in the center of the village of Aghtsk in the Aragatsotn Province of Armenia.  It is best known for the mausoleum that once contained the remains of both Christian and pagan kings of the Arshakid dynasty of Armenia.  Approximately one hundred meters north of the basilica and tomb complex is a shrine that sits alongside a path leading down to the gorge below, where there are many caves that date from the 16th-18th centuries.  Some of the caves have doors and were used during these periods as refuge from invasions.

History 
According to the Epic Histories written by the 5th-century historian Pavstos Buzand (also known as Faustus of Byzantium), he accounts that King Shapur II the Great of Persia after having recaptured Armenia and occupying Ani-Kamakh, discovered there the treasures and tombs of the Armenian Arshakuni Kings.  He ordered his troops to exhume the royal remains and in doing so, destroyed the Arshakuni ancestral tombs that were at Ani-Kamakh.  There was however the tomb of King Sanatruk that escaped this looting and destruction due to its enormous, impenetrable and ingeniously built structure.  

The loot and exhumed remains of the other kings were then carried off en route to Persia with the belief that the land in which the kings' bones were interred would gain their fame, fortune and strength.  King Shapur II wanted to reduce the morale of the Armenians as well. The Armenian Sparapet Vassak Mamikonian during the mid-4th century gathered together approximately 60,000 troops and defeated the Persians in the district of Ayrarat, recapturing the treasures and bones of the Armenian kings.  He brought the royal remains to Dzorap (modern day Aghtsk) where he soon had them reinterred at a newly constructed mausoleum, separating Christian kings from the pagan kings.

A church was constructed adjacent to the site in the late 4th - early 5th centuries, and the tombs at Dzorap continued to be used through the early 5th century until the Arsacid dynasty came to an end.  According to the historian Movses Khorenatsi in his History of Armenia, that after subsequent earthquakes and invasions at Dzorap, a decision was made to move the royal remains once again to a final safer location at Vagharshapat (also known as Echmiadzin) in Armenia.  

The following passage describes the event in an excerpt from the Epic Histories written by Pavstos Buzand in the 5th century:

Architecture

Mausoleum 
The mausoleum that had once contained the bones of the Ashakid kings was constructed in the mid-late 4th century. The low-vaulted chamber is semi-cruciform in plan, with rectangular ossuary niches centered within the structure to the north and south where the royal remains had been placed.  Above each niche is an open arch, and in front of the small hall at the eastern end of the tomb is a semi-circular apse.  Only a small amount of light peers into the tomb from the outside through the single portal at the western end.  Just beyond the door leading outside is a small porch with stone steps that lead up to the ground level. Some exterior bas relief decoration of hunting scenes may still be faintly seen around the portal upon the half-rounded lintel and columns.  Most of the carvings have been obliterated over the years.  At the time that it was constructed, the structure was two stories tall (the lower chamber having been built below ground) but now only the lower chamber remains.

Each ossuary box is made of stone and is decorated with bas relief depicting two separate scenes.  On one (north), the Biblical story of Daniel in the lions' den and a motif of rams is depicted while on the other (south) there are depictions of a mythical hero alongside astrological imagery of birds, a calf amid a grape vine, a cross within a circle with two birds perched on top and a hunter with two dogs striking a wild boar.  According to legend, the ossuary that had the Biblical relief held the bones of the Christian kings while that with the relief of the mythical hero held the bones of the pagan kings.

Basilica 
A late-4th to early-5th-century basilica sits adjoined to the north end of the mausoleum.  It was constructed with a central nave with four columns that separated it from the aisles to either side.  Directly in front of the nave was a semi-circular apse with a single study or “prayer room” to the side.  Only the lower walls remain standing today along with some of the larger stones, some of which have relief carved into their surfaces.  During the 19th century the church was partially reconstructed.

Gallery

References

Bibliography

External links
 Armenianmonuments.org: Aghtsk Tombs
 Armenica.org: Basilica and the Arshakid Kings Mausoleum
 TravelArmenia.com: Arshakid Dynasty Tomb
 Pavstos Buzand’s Epic Histories (Online)

Buildings and structures completed in the 5th century
Christian monasteries in Armenia
Tourist attractions in Aragatsotn Province
Buildings and structures in Aragatsotn Province
Mausoleums in Armenia